Mohammed-Sani Abdulai is a Ghanaian educator and IT professional. He is currently the president of Lakeside University College.

Early life 
Abdulai was born on 2 May 1956 in Yendi in the Northern region of Ghana. His father Abdulai Adam was a vulcanizer in Tamale and his mother Martha Sandow was a petty trader.

Abdulai gained admission to the then Government Secondary School (now Tamale Senior High School) in 1969 to obtain his SC/GCE Ordinary-Level qualification, which he completed in 1974, majoring in the Sciences. He thereafter proceeded to pursue his GCE Advanced-Level programme at Bawku Senior High School, where he completed in 1976 and obtained his GCE Advanced-Level Certificate in Mathematics, Physics, Economics and General Paper.

Higher education
After completing his high-school education, he gained admission to the University of Cape Coast in 1976 and pursued a bachelor's degree in mathematics major and physics minor degree programme, graduating with honours. He also obtained a diploma degree in mathematics education from the same institution, completed in 1980. On completion of his studies in 1980, he was retained as a faculty intern at the Computer Centre of the university, where his interest in information technology began. Dr Abdulai is an alumnus of the Norwegian University of Science and Technology (NTNU) and the Korea Advanced Institute of Science and Technology (KAIST).

Career 
Abdulai served on various ICT-related boards and committees in Ghana, including National ICT Policy and Planning and the National Communications Authority. As of August 2017, he was the board chairman for National Information Technology Agency, board member at Environmental Protection Agency, board member and ICT consultant designate at the Ghana Interbank Payment and Settlement System, vice-chair of the board of trustees at the Ghana chapter of Internet Society, and chair of the executive management team of Information Technology Association of Ghana.

He took up lecture positions between 1994 and 2007 at the University of Ghana, National College of Banking, GIMPA and Ashesi University.

Abdulai's interests span advocacy research into technology developmental challenges in Africa. Between 2007 and 2012, he was Director of Research, Innovation and Development at Ghana-India Kofi Annan Centre of Excellence in ICT. He was in charge of Institutional Research, Innovation and Development at two institutions in Ghana: the Madina Institute of Science and Technology and University of Professional Studies. He founded the African Centre For Development Informatics in 2015 as an advisory centre that focuses on leveraging informatics for accelerated development of the African continent.

He is professionally affiliated with the IEEE Computer Society and Ghana Science Association.

Abdulai is the head of Information Services and Technology at the Ghana Hajj commission since 2017.

After taking up the role of vice-president at Madina Institute of Science and Technology until 2019, he was thereafter appointed as the president of the institution in 2021. He succeeded Abdulai Salifu Asuro.

Personal life
Abdulai is married to Zainab Mohammed-Sani. He has five children, including Jemila Abdulai.

References

1956 births
Academic staff of Ashesi University
Academic staff of Lakeside University College
Academic staff of the University of Ghana
Dagomba people
Ghanaian computer scientists
Living people